Klaudia Konopko (born 21 February 1992) is a Polish sprinter. She competed in the women's 4 × 100 metres relay event at the 2016 Summer Olympics.

References

External links
 

1992 births
Living people
Polish female sprinters
Athletes (track and field) at the 2016 Summer Olympics
Olympic athletes of Poland
Sportspeople from Białystok
Olympic female sprinters
21st-century Polish women